Oristicta is a genus of damselflies belonging to the family Isostictidae.
It is endemic to north-eastern Australia.
Species of Orosticta are slender, medium-sized damselflies with a dull colouring.

Species 
The genus Oristicta includes the following species:

Oristicta filicicola  
Oristicta rosendaleorum

References

Isostictidae
Zygoptera genera
Odonata of Australia
Endemic fauna of Australia
Taxa named by Robert John Tillyard
Insects described in 1913
Damselflies